Mount Tarawera is a volcano on the North Island of New Zealand within the older but volcanically productive Ōkataina Caldera. Located 24 kilometres southeast of Rotorua, it consists of a series of rhyolitic lava domes that were fissured down the middle by an explosive basaltic eruption in 1886. This eruption was one of New Zealand's largest historical eruptions, and killed an estimated 120 people.

The volcano's component domes include Ruawahia Dome (the highest at 1,111 metres), Tarawera Dome and Wahanga Dome. It is surrounded by several lakes, most of which were created or drastically altered by the 1886 eruption. These lakes include Lakes Tarawera, Rotomahana, Rerewhakaaitu, Ōkataina, Ōkareka, Tikitapu / Blue and Rotokākahi / Green. The Tarawera River runs northeastwards across the northern flank of the mountain from Lake Tarawera. In 2000, the mountain was ceded to the Ngāti Rangitihi sub-tribe of Te Arawa. In 2002, the group and their lessee stopped previously free public access to the mountain. This decision caused angst among Rotorua residents.

While the 1886 eruption was basaltic, study has shown there was only a small basalt component to the previous recent rhyolitic predominant eruptions.

History

Ōkareka eruption
The Ōkareka Tephra generating eruption has now been dated to 21,900 years before the present with a tephra volume of about  but may be less, generated in days or weeks at the most. Lava fields at the western end came from sources most likely buried in the Waiohau eruption, have a volume of at least , and would have taken several years to form. The Ōkareka Embayment is a separate, but adjacent volcanic structure in the Ōkataina Caldera responsible for the Rotorua Tephra.

Rerewhakaaitu eruption
Other historic sources suggested a higher volume. The Southern and Western Domes  were formed at this time and the lava excursion of  again lasted for several years after the much shorter tephra phase of the eruption.

Waiohau eruption
The Waiohau eruption occurred about 13,800 years ago (recently re-dated backward). The Kanakana and Eastern Domes were formed. During one of the eruptions structural collapse of the then mountain occurred.

Kaharoa eruption
Mount Tarawera erupted 1314±12 CE in the Kaharoa eruption. This was just a few years after the first Māori settlement about 1280 CE although more wide spread settlement is now believed to have not taken place until 1320 to 1350 AD. The total dense rock equivalent (DRE) was at least . The essential mineral poor Kaharoa Tephra which was a factor in New Zealand bush sickness was distributed from the east coast of the Northland Peninsula, down the Coromandel Peninsula and through beyond Tarawera to northern Hawke Bay at the Māhia Peninsula. The total volume of material erupted was more than 5 times that of the 1886 eruption and has been stated to be at least  of tephra. The Ruawahia, Tarawera(), Wahanga() and Crater Domes were formed.

1886 eruption 

Shortly after midnight on the morning of 10 June 1886, a series of more than 30 increasingly strong earthquakes were felt in the Rotorua area and by 2:45 am Mount Tarawera's three peaks had erupted, blasting three distinct columns of smoke and ash thousands of metres into the sky At around 3.30 am, the largest phase of the eruption commenced; vents at Rotomahana produced a pyroclastic surge that destroyed several villages within a 6 kilometer radius, and the Pink and White Terraces appeared to be obliterated. Recent research using mathematical modelling of events during the later Rotomahana eruption phase,  is consistent with eyewitness accounts; describing it resembling a pot boiling over.

Settlements inhabited by Ngāti Rangitihi and Tūhourangi around the Ariki arm of Lake Tarawera, including Moura, Koutu, Kokotaia, Piripai, Pukekiore and Otuapane, Tapahoro, Te Wairoa, Totarariki, and Waingongoro, were buried or destroyed. Of these, Te Wairoa is now a tourist attraction and is described as the "buried village". The official death toll was reported as 153, and many more were displaced, making the eruption the most deadly in New Zealand history. The survivors became refugees in their own country, for generations. 

The eruption was also believed to have destroyed the world-famous Pink and White Terraces. However, 125 years after the eruption a small portion of the Pink Terraces was reportedly rediscovered under Lake Rotomahana. This was due to the discovery of a previously unknown 1859 survey of Lake Rotomahana by Ferdinand von Hochstetter, which was deciphered and published between 2016 and 2019. This unique primary data indicate the Pink, Black and White Terrace locations now lie along the present lake shores. There is a prospect the terraces or sections of them, may lie buried, and as a result the terraces can no longer be assumed destroyed.

The phantom waka

One legend surrounding the 1886 eruption is that of the phantom waka (canoe). Eleven days before the eruption, a boat full of tourists returning from the Terraces saw what appeared to be a waka approach their boat, only to disappear in the mist half a mile from them. One of the witnesses was a clergyman, a local Maori man from the Te Arawa iwi. Nobody around the lake owned such a war canoe, and nothing like it had been seen on the lake for many years.
It is possible that the rise and fall of the lake level caused by pre-eruption fissures had freed a burial waka from its resting place. Traditionally, the dead were tied in an upright position. A number of letters have been published from the tourists who experienced the event.

Though skeptics maintained that it was a freak reflection seen on the mist, tribal elders at Te Wairoa claimed that it was a waka wairua (spirit canoe) and was a portent of doom. It has been suggested that the waka was actually a freak wave on the water, caused by seismic activity below the lake, but locals believe that a future eruption will be signalled by the reappearance of the waka.

Geology
It is within the Ōkataina Caldera of the Ōkataina Volcanic Centre in the central segment of the Taupō Volcanic Zone. This rhyolitic segment is dominated by explosive caldera. The dyke and linear line of vents align with the Taupō Rift at this point.

Gallery

See also
 List of mountains of New Zealand by height
 List of volcanoes in New Zealand
 Volcanology of New Zealand

References

External links

 Global Volcanism Program page for Tarawera and Okataina
 Buried Village of Te Wairoa – Archaeological Site
 Okataina Volcanic Centre/ Mt Tarawera Volcano – GNS Science
 Tarawera (Okataina) – National Museum of Natural History

Okataina Volcanic Centre
Volcanoes of the Bay of Plenty Region
Lava domes
1886 natural disasters
1886 in New Zealand
19th-century volcanic events
History of the Bay of Plenty Region
Tara
VEI-5 volcanoes
Rotorua Lakes District
Taupō Volcanic Zone